Janusz Mirosław Krasoń (pronounced ; born 15 September 1956 in Jawor) is a Polish politician. He was elected to the Sejm on 25 September 2005, getting 15,162 votes in 3 Wrocław district as a candidate from the Democratic Left Alliance list.

He was also a member of Sejm 2001-2005.

See also
Members of Polish Sejm 2005-2007

External links
Official site
Janusz Krasoń - parliamentary page - includes declarations of interest, voting record, and transcripts of speeches.

1956 births
Living people
Democratic Left Alliance politicians
Members of the Polish Sejm 2005–2007
Members of the Polish Sejm 2001–2005
Members of the Polish Sejm 2007–2011